Montoy-Flanville is a former commune in the Moselle department in Grand Est in north-eastern France. On 1 January 2017, it was merged into the new commune Ogy-Montoy-Flanville.

See also
 Communes of the Moselle department

References 

Montoyflanville
Populated places disestablished in 2017